Shirley Scott Plays Horace Silver is an album by organist Shirley Scott featuring compositions by Horace Silver which was recorded in 1961 and released on the Prestige label.

Reception

The Allmusic review stated "Just what it says. The queen of the Hammond organ plays compositions by the funk-master himself".

Track listing 
All compositions by Horace Silver
 "Señor Blues" – 4:02
 "Moonray" – 5:41
 "Sister Sadie" – 7:24
 "Doodlin'" – 5:20
 "The Preacher" – 5:17
 "Strollin'" – 6:22

Personnel 
 Shirley Scott - organ
 Henry Grimes - bass
 Otis Finch - drums

References 

1962 albums
Albums produced by Esmond Edwards
Albums recorded at Van Gelder Studio
Prestige Records albums
Shirley Scott albums